The 2016 Weber State Wildcats football team represented Weber State University in the 2016 NCAA Division I FCS football season. The Wildcats were led by third year head coach Jay Hill and played their games at Stewart Stadium and were members of the Big Sky Conference. They finished the season 7–5, 6–2 in Big Sky play to finish in third place. They received an at-large bid to the FCS Playoffs where they lost to Chattanooga in the first round.

Schedule

Despite also being a member of the Big Sky Conference, the game with Sacramento State on September 17 is considered a non-conference game.

Game summaries

at Utah State

at South Dakota

Sacramento State

at UC Davis

Portland State

Montana State

at Southern Utah

at North Dakota

Northern Arizona

Cal Poly

at Idaho State

FCS Playoffs

First Round–Chattanooga

Ranking movements

References

Weber State
Weber State Wildcats football seasons
2016 NCAA Division I FCS playoff participants
Weber State Wildcats football